was a village located in Soekami District, Nara Prefecture, Japan.

As of 2003, the village had an estimated population of 1,913 and a density of 89.60 persons per km². The total area was 21.35 km².

On April 1, 2005, Tsukigase, along with the village of Tsuge (from Yamabe District), was merged into the expanded city of Nara.

Dissolved municipalities of Nara Prefecture
Populated places disestablished in 2005
2005 disestablishments in Japan